Geneviève Huriet (b. August 24, 1927 in France) is the author of the Beechwood Bunny Tales (La Famille Passiflore) children's book series. Huriet lives in Paris with her diplomat husband and four children, and has travelled abroad in Japan, Britain, Angola and elsewhere. She once worked as a librarian, and began writing for her nine grandchildren before launching her career.

Her works have been published by Éditions Milan, Grasset Jeunesse and Albin Michel in her native country. Only the first seven Beechwood stories have seen English translations from Gareth Stevens (in 1991 and 1992).

A European TV show based on the Beechwood books was launched in late December 2001.

References

1927 births
Living people
French children's writers
French women children's writers
French expatriates in Japan
French expatriates in the United Kingdom
French expatriates in Angola